Rungano Nyoni is a Zambian-Welsh director and screenwriter. She is known for the film I Am Not a Witch, which she wrote and directed. The film won Nyoni the BAFTA for Outstanding Debut in 2018 and has also garnered accolades from international film festivals. Her 2009 film, The List, won the Welsh BAFTA Award for Best Short Film.

Early life and education
Nyoni was born in Lusaka, Zambia to Merill Mutale (née Nyoni) and Thomas Nyoni. They chose to name her Rungano, which in the Shona language native to Zimbabwe means “storyteller”. When she was nine years old her family migrated to Wales.

She attended the University of Birmingham, where she received a Bachelor of Commerce degree in Business Studies. After finishing her studies at the University of Birmingham, Nyoni decided to study acting at the University of the Arts London as it had always been her dream to become an actress. During her time there she was drawn to scripting and to work behind the camera, but retained her desire to act. Nyoni went on to complete her master's degree in Drama and in 2009, graduated from Drama Centre London with a master's degree in acting.

Career 
Nyoni has stated that her first influence into film was the Elfriede Jelinek's novel The Piano Teacher, which she had chosen from the library because of the picture on the cover. She has stated that the novel's 2001 film adaptation is one of her favourite films and that she “wanted to be just like Isabelle Huppert" as her performance "had a huge effect on me. I quickly realized that I couldn’t be like Isabelle Huppert because I’m not a very good actor, but I was still curious about the directing. That was a big turning point for me, realizing that if directing is done very well it can have a real effect on people.”

In 2006 Nyoni released her first film Yande (meaning "My Great Happiness" in Bemba), which she wrote and shot on black and white super 8mm film. The film deals with fashion and African women who westernized their appearance and mannerisms in order to conform to an "ideal." She released her next two short films, 20 Questions and The List in 2009; the latter won a BAFTA Cymru Award in 2010.

Her fourth film, Mwansa the Great, was released in 2011 and was selected to screen at over 100 international film festivals. It was well received at the festivals and won over 20 prizes and was nominated for a 2012 BAFTA Award. Nyoni often collaborates with her partner Gabriel Gauchet and in 2012 a film directed by Gauchet and written by Nyoni, The Mass of Men, premiered at the Locarno Film Festival, where it won the Golden Leopard Award. Like Mwansa the Great, the film was selected to be shown at over 100 film festivals and also garnered over 50 prizes. This was followed up by her 2014 short Listen (Kuuntele), which received the Best Short Film Award at the 2015 Tribeca Film Festival.

In 2017 Nyoni released her first feature-length fiction film,I Am Not a Witch, which was selected to screen at the Directors' Fortnight of Cannes Film Festival 2017. This film went on to win Nyoni the awards for Best Director and Best Debut Director at the 20th British Independent Film Awards in 2017.

Filmography

Director / Writer / Producer/ Editor

The List (2010)
A group of drama students are fixated on a surprise list as they are preparing for their final showcase.

The Mass of Men (2012)
When Richard, an unemployed man of 55, arrives three minutes late for an appointment at the job-centre, Kate penalizes him for his tardiness. To avoid plunging further into destitution, Richard takes desperate measures.

Mwansa the Great (2012)
The film follows three children: Mwansa, Shula, Tipa. They live in a small village outside of Lusaka, Zambia, with their mother; their father has recently died. The story focuses on the eight-year-old boy who aspires to be a hero embarks upon a journey to prove his greatness, with unexpected consequences to fix his sister's doll.

Z1 (2013)
After years of resentment and distrust in a faltering relationship, Ruth and Guy decide to go forward with their separation, but as their relationship ends their 10-year-old son Max, begins to behave strangely.

Listen/Nordic Factory (2014)
A Muslim woman wearing a burka goes into a police station, and begs the police to help her take action against her abusive husband. As she cannot speak the native language communication begins to break down between the two sides. A translator is brought, but she filters the experience through her own background and sides with the husband.

This film was produced by Nordic Factory, which specializes in stimulating cultural meetings between young filmmakers by giving them an international platform to work and collaborate with others on their early feature projects. Through the Nordic Factory Nyoni and Hamy Ramzen collaborated to create Listen, which was re-released and showcased through Nordic Factories archival collection.

Actress

Awards and nominations

In 2018, celebrating Black History Month in the United Kingdom, Nyoni was included in a list of 100 Brilliant, Black and Welsh people.

External links

References

Living people
Alumni of the University of the Arts London
Outstanding Debut by a British Writer, Director or Producer BAFTA Award winners
People from Lusaka
Welsh actresses
Welsh film directors
Welsh screenwriters
Zambian emigrants to the United Kingdom
Zambian film directors
Year of birth missing (living people)